Botto is a surname. Notable people with this surname include:

 António Botto (1897-1959), Portuguese aesthete and lyricist poet
 Benjamin Abrahão Botto (1890-1938), Lebanese photographer
 Bianca Botto (born 1991), former Peruvian tennis player
 Giuseppe Domenico Botto (1791-1865), Italian physicist
 Iacopo Botto (born 1987), Italian male volleyball player
 Ján Botto (1829-1881), Slovak poet and writer of the Štúr generation 
 Juan Diego Botto (born 1975), Argentine-Spanish actor
 Lewis Botto (1898-1953), English professional footballer

See also 
 Botti
 Botta